The second season of Friends, an American sitcom created by David Crane and Marta Kauffman, premiered on NBC on September 21, 1995. Friends was produced by Bright/Kauffman/Crane Productions, in association with Warner Bros. Television. The season contains 24 episodes and concluded airing on May 16, 1996.

Reception
On Rotten Tomatoes season 2 has 3 reviews listed, all positive.

Collider ranked the season #7 on their ranking of the ten Friends seasons. According to them, "The One with the Prom Video" was its standout episode.

Cast and characters

(In particular, Introduced in season 2 or Only in season 2)

Main cast
 Jennifer Aniston as Rachel Green
 Courteney Cox as Monica Geller
 Lisa Kudrow as Phoebe Buffay
 Matt LeBlanc as Joey Tribbiani
 Matthew Perry as Chandler Bing
 David Schwimmer as Ross Geller

Recurring cast
 Lauren Tom as Julie
 Mike Hagerty as Mr. Treeger
 Tom Selleck as Richard Burke
 Adam Goldberg as Eddie Menuek
 Jane Sibbett as Carol Willick
 Jessica Hecht as Susan Bunch
 June Gable as Estelle Leonard
 James Michael Tyler as Gunther

Guest stars
 Audra Lindley as Frances (Phoebe's Grandmother)
 Maggie Wheeler as Janice Litman
 Cosimo Fusco as Paolo
 Marlo Thomas as Sandra Green
 Ron Leibman as Leonard Green
 Elliott Gould as Jack Geller
 Christina Pickles as Judy Geller
 Emily Procter as Annabel
 Joel Beeson as The Hombre Man (Todd)
 Brittney Powell as Jade
 Chris Young as Steven Fishman
 Max Wright as Terry
 Chrissie Hynde as Stephanie Schiffer
 Lea Thompson as the Caroline Duffy (uncredited)
 Giovanni Ribisi as "condom boy" (uncredited)
 Arye Gross as Michael
 Michael McKean as Mr. Rastatter
 Vincent Ventresca as Fun Bobby 
 Phil Leeds as Mr. Adelman
 Brooke Shields as Erika
 Chris Isaak as Rob Donnen
 Fred Willard as the zookeeper
 Dan Castellaneta as the zoo janitor
 Jean-Claude Van Damme as himself
 Julia Roberts as Susie Moss
 Charlie Sheen as Ryan
 Brain Posehn as the script messenger
 Mitchell Whitfield as Barry Farber

Episodes

Notes

References

External links
 

02
1995 American television seasons
1996 American television seasons